Jacques Léon Godechot (3 January 1907 – 24 August 1989) was a French historian of the French revolution, and a pioneer of Atlantic history.

As a frequent and varied contributor to the Annales Historiques de la Révolution Française, he acted as "a mediator, an intermediary between readers of the journal and Anglo-Saxon and Italian historiography of the Revolution". His emphasis on the international dimension of the late-eighteenth and early-nineteenth-century revolutions was crystallized in the concepts of Atlantic history and 'occidental revolution'. In 1955 Godechot collaborated with the Yale historian Robert Roswell Palmer to present a joint paper on 'the problem of Atlantic history' at the 10th International Congress of Historical Sciences in Rome.

Works
 Histoire de l'Atlantique, Paris: Bordas, 1947
 Les institutions de la France sous la Révolution et l'émpire, Paris: Presses Universitaires de France, 1951
 (with R. R. Palmer) 'Le problème de l’Atlantique du XVIIIième au XXième siècle.' Comitato internazionale di scienze storiche. X8 Congresso internazionale di Scienze storiche, Roma 4–11 Settembre 1955. Relazioni 5 (Storia contemporanea). Florence, 1955: 175–239
 La grande nation: l'expansion révolutionnaire de la France dans le monde de 1789 à 1799, Paris: Aubier, 1956.
 La contre-révolution: doctrine et action, 1789-1804, Paris Presses universitaires de France, 1961. Translated by Salvator Attanasio as The counter-revolution: doctrine and action, 1789-1804, 1971.
 La pensée révolutionnaire en France et en Europe, 1780-1799, Paris: A. Colin, 1963
 L'Europe et l'Amérique à l'époque napoléonienne (1800-1815), Paris: Presses universitaires de France, 1967
 La prise de la Bastille 14 juillet 1789, Paris: Gallimard, 1965. Translated by Jean Stewart, with an introduction by Charles Tilly as The taking of the Bastille, July 14th, 1789, 1970
 Les Révolutions, 1770–1799, Paris: Presses universitaires de France, 1963. Translated by Herbert H. Rowen as France and the Atlantic revolution of the eighteenth century, 1770-1799, 1965.
 (with Beatrice Fry Hyslop and David L. Dowd) The Napoleonic era in Europe, New York: Holt, Rinehart and Winston, 1971.
 Les Constitutions de la France depuis 1789, Flammarion, Paris, 1979 .
 (ed.) Considérations sur la Révolution française by Madame de Staël

References 

People from Lunéville
1907 births
1989 deaths
20th-century French historians
Historians of the French Revolution
French male non-fiction writers
Winners of the Prix Broquette-Gonin (literature)
20th-century French male writers

French academics